Ella Baché is a French skin care brand created in Paris by pharmacist Madame Baché in 1936.

References

External links
Official website

Cosmetics companies of France